The 2015 Southern Jaguars football team represented Southern University in the 2015 NCAA Division I FCS football season. The Jaguars were led by third-year head coach Dawson Odums. The Jaguars played their home games at Ace W. Mumford Stadium and were a member of the West Division of the Southwestern Athletic Conference (SWAC). They finished the season 6–5, 6–3 in SWAC play to finish in third place in the West Division.

Schedule

References

Southern
Southern Jaguars football seasons
Southern Jaguars football